Kismet may refer to:

Comics
Kismet (Marvel Comics), a superheroine
Kismet, Man of Fate, the first Muslim superhero, originally published by Gilberton Publications

Film
Kismet (1920 film), a film starring Otis Skinner and directed by Louis J. Gasnier, based on the 1911 play
Kismet (1930 film), a film starring Loretta Young and Otis Skinner, also based on the play
Kismet (1931 film), a film by William Dieterle, also based on the play
Kismet (1932 film), a Hindi film by Baburao Patel
Kismet (1943 film), a Hindi film starring Ashok Kumar
Kismet (1944 film), a film starring Ronald Colman and Marlene Dietrich, also based on the play
Kismet (1955 film), a film by Vincente Minnelli and based on the 1953 musical
Kismet (1956), a 1956 Indian-Turkish film by Nanabhai Bhatt and Semih Evin
Kismet (1956 film), a Pakistani drama film
Kismet (1967 film), an American TV film
Kismet (1980 film), a Hindi film starring Mithun Chakraborty
Kismet, a 1999 American short starring Stephanie Niznik

Music
Kismet (band), a 1993–2002 Australian rock group formed as an offshoot of Mizar

Albums
Kismet (Adriana Evans album) (2005)
Kismet (Jesca Hoop album) (2007)
Kismet (The Mastersounds album) (1958)
Kismet, an album by Stelios Petrakis and Bijan Cherimani of the Chemirani Ensemble

Songs
"Kismet" (Elitsa & Stoyan song), the 2013 Bulgarian Eurovision entry
"Kismet", a song by Bond from Born
"Kismet", a song by Flowing Tears from Thy Kingdom Gone
"Kismet", an instrumental song by Kamelot from Silverthorn
"Kismet", a song by Elvis Presley from Harum Scarum
"Kismet", a song by Silent Sanctuary
"Kismet", a single by XIX

Places
Kismet, California, an unincorporated community
Kismet, Kansas, a village near Kansas's southwestern corner
Kismet, New York, a hamlet on Fire Island, New York

Stage
Kismet (play), a 1911 play by Edward Knoblock
Kismet (musical), a 1953 musical version of the 1911 play

Technology
Kismet (gameplay scripting), a scripting tool for the Unreal Engine from Epic Games
Kismet (robot), a robot intended to demonstrate simulated emotion
Kismet (software), software used to analyze wireless network traffic

Other uses
Kismet (chocolate bar), a Finnish chocolate bar
Kismet (dice game)
Kismet (yacht), a 2014 superyacht
Kismet, a Drosophila Trithorax-group protein homologous to CHD7

See also
Akismet, a server-based spam filter
Ashima, Semitic goddess of fate
Destiny or fate
Kismat (disambiguation)
Kismath (disambiguation)